The Ohio State University at Lima (Ohio State Lima) is a regional campus of Ohio State University in Lima, Ohio. It offers over 140 courses and 9 bachelor degree programs in science and liberal arts. Nine of eleven programs are four-year programs at Lima. Two of them are baccalaureate completion programs. In addition to regional accreditation, Ohio State Lima has baccalaureate program accreditation with NCATE. The campus practices open admissions. Students can start at Lima and finish their degrees at The Ohio State University, Columbus with one of Ohio State's 170+ majors. The Ohio State University at Lima offers over 20 student clubs and organizations.  The Lima Campus Library has 76,000 volumes and 200+ journal subscriptions. Library databases also provide access to thousands of online journals. The university shares the campus with Rhodes State College.

Student life

Student organizations 
The Ohio State University at Lima offers students opportunities for social, recreational, cultural, and educational growth.

References

External links 
 
 

Lima Campus, Ohio State University
Lima, Ohio
Educational institutions established in 1960
Education in Allen County, Ohio
Buildings and structures in Lima, Ohio
Tourist attractions in Allen County, Ohio
1960 establishments in Ohio